Telephone numbers in the Philippines follow an open telephone numbering plan and an open dial plan. Both plans are regulated by the National Telecommunications Commission, an attached agency under the Department of Information and Communications Technology (DICT).

The Philippines is assigned an international dialing code of 63 by ITU-T. Telephone numbers are fixed at eight digits for area code 02, and seven digits for area codes from 03X to 09X, with area codes fixed at one, two, or three digits (a six-digit system was used until the mid-1990s; four to five digits were used in the countryside). Mobile phone numbers are always 10 digits (three digits for the service provider, plus a seven-digit number).

When making long-distance calls in the Philippines, the prefix 0 for domestic calls and 00 for international calls are used.

Fixed-line area codes
Philippine area codes for fixed-line or landline telephones are fixed at two digits, excluding Metro Manila, the province of Rizal and the cities of Bacoor in Cavite and San Pedro in Laguna, which use the area code 2. Some smaller carriers concentrated within a specific geographic area may issue four- or five-digit area codes, but these are being phased out in favor of the standard two-digit area codes.

Occasionally, a particular area may change area codes. For example, the City of Bacoor in Cavite has been included in the geographical coverage area of area code 2 per the National Telecommunications Commission's Memorandum Order No. 08-09-2011, although almost all fixed-lines in the city still use the old 46 area code due to the poor compliance of PLDT and Globe to the said memorandum order. PLDT's response to the memorandum order is the release of its "Call All Manila SIM", an exclusive wireless landline service for Bacoor residents, however, the Barangay Molino VII (Sitio Gawaran) and Sitio Malipay in Molino IV now use area code 2.

Sometimes area codes are shared by several local government entities to maximize their use. Some area codes are shared by multiple provinces, as is the case for former sub-provinces like Guimaras and Iloilo; newly carved provinces like Zamboanga Sibugay and Zamboanga del Sur; or provinces with small populations like Marinduque and Quezon. In extreme cases, area codes are shared across an island like in Leyte and Samar, or even entire regions, such as with the Cordillera Administrative Region. To identify the call's point of origin, the three-digit telephone exchange prefix is checked.

Since the Philippines employs an open dial plan, telephone numbers dialed within a given area code do not require the area code, excluding calls made from mobile phones or payphones. When dialing other area codes, the domestic long-distance access prefix 0 is added, but when dialing from overseas, the domestic prefix is not included. As such, a typical telephone number in Metro Manila and Rizal would look like this:

Within Metro Manila, Rizal, and cities of Bacoor and San Pedro: 8123-4567
Outside Metro Manila, Rizal, and cities of Bacoor and San Pedro: 02-8123-4567
Overseas calls: +63-2-8123-4567

Since October 6, 2019, all telephone numbers under area 2 had been migrated to eight digits as mandated by the National Telecommunications Commission per Memorandum Order No. 10-10-2017 to address the insufficient number of assignable local exchange codes.

The maintenance for the migration from the usual 7-digit number (XXX-YYYY) to 8-digit (PXXX-YYYY) is from 12:00 AM to 05:00 AM.

It lasted five hours of disconnection on telephones and it will also affect subscription-based virtual telephone numbers (i.e. Globe Duo), SIM card-based Telephone Service (i.e. PLDT Landline Plus Prepaid), #MyNumber (The format is #XXXXX, i.e. #87000 for Jollibee Delivery), FEX Lines, SIP Trunks, ISDN and Vanity Numbers, Including virtual numbers like short-digit numbers (i.e. *1888, which is the PLDT Telephone Support, and 211, which is the Talk2Globe or the Globe Prepaid Help and Support), Toll Free (domestic, international and universal, i.e. 1-800-1-123-4567, in dialing, 00-800-1-123-4567) and Premium numbers such as embassy hotline and 1900 service hotline.

Since October 6, 2019, 5 AM, the following telephone number format to be followed:

PXXX-YYYY where P is for Public Telecommunication Entity, and the XXX-YYYY is the telephone number.

NTC has assigned the following Public Telecommunications Entity (PTE) identifiers:

3000-YYYY to 3499-YYYY: Bayan Telecommunications
5300-YYYY to 5799-YYYY: Eastern Communications Philippines
6000-YYYY to 6699-YYYY: ABS-CBN Convergence
7XXX-YYYY: Globe Telecom / Innove Communications
8XXX-YYYY: PLDT / Digital Telecommunications Philippines

Areas are grouped into seven broad areas determining the first digit of a given area code. These areas and their accompanying area codes are listed below:

Area 2 – National Capital Region, Rizal and Surroundings
2: Metro Manila, Rizal, Cavite (Bacoor), Laguna (San Pedro)

Area 3 – Western and Central Visayas
32: Cebu
33: Iloilo, Guimaras
34: Negros Occidental
35: Negros Oriental, Siquijor
36: Aklan, Antique, Capiz
38: Bohol

Area 4 – Central Luzon and Southern Tagalog (Calabarzon and Mimaropa)
42: Aurora, Marinduque, Quezon, Romblon
43: Batangas, Occidental Mindoro, Oriental Mindoro
44: Bulacan, Nueva Ecija
45: Pampanga, Tarlac
46: Cavite (except Bacoor)
47: Bataan, Zambales
48: Palawan
49: Laguna (except San Pedro)

Area 5 – Bicol Region and Eastern Visayas
52: Albay, Catanduanes
53: Biliran, Leyte, Southern Leyte
54: Camarines Norte, Camarines Sur
55: Eastern Samar, Northern Samar, Western Samar
56: Masbate, Sorsogon

Area 6 – Western and Central Mindanao (Zamboanga Peninsula, Bangsamoro and Northern Soccsksargen)
62: Basilan, Zamboanga del Sur (including Zamboanga City), Zamboanga Sibugay
63: Lanao del Norte, Lanao del Sur
64: Cotabato, Maguindanao del Norte, Maguindanao del Sur, Sultan Kudarat
65: Zamboanga del Norte
68: Sulu, Tawi-Tawi

Area 7 – Northern Luzon (Ilocos Region, Cagayan Valley and Cordillera Administrative Region)
72: La Union
74: Abra, Apayao, Benguet, Ifugao, Kalinga, Mountain Province
75: Pangasinan
77: Ilocos Norte, Ilocos Sur
78: Batanes, Cagayan, Isabela, Nueva Vizcaya, Quirino

Area 8 – Northern, Eastern and Southern Mindanao (including Davao Region, Caraga and Southern Soccsksargen)
82: Davao del Sur, Davao Occidental
83: Sarangani, South Cotabato
84: Davao de Oro, Davao del Norte
85: Agusan del Norte, Agusan del Sur
86: Dinagat Islands, Surigao del Norte, Surigao del Sur
87: Davao Oriental
88: Bukidnon, Camiguin, Misamis Occidental, Misamis Oriental

List of fixed-line area codes

Mobile phone area codes
Mobile area codes are three digits long and always start with the number 9, although new area codes have been issued with 8 as the starting digit, particularly for VOIP phone numbers. However, the area code indicates the service provider and not necessarily a geographic region. Unlike fixed-line telephones, the long-distance telephone dialing format is always observed when using a mobile phone. Therefore, mobile phone numbers always have the format "+63 966 164-5400" for international callers and "0 966 164-5400" for domestic callers.

Some of the first area codes to be assigned for mobile phones were 912 for Mobiline/Piltel, 915 for Islacom, 917 for Globe Telecom, 918 for Smart Communications, and 973 for Express Telecom. As service began growing rapidly since the 1990s, new codes have been added to meet demand as existing codes have since been exhausted. Newer codes often come immediately after the last code is exhausted, but this might not be the case if the next code is already in use. Starting October 21, 2020, Sun's prepaid service was merged and rebranded into Smart Prepaid, leaving its postpaid service under "Sun" branding. Beginning March 2021, Dito Telecommunity launched new mobile number prefixes, 895, 896, 897, 898, 991, 992, 993 and 994 assigned to Dito Prepaid, Dito Postpaid and Dito WiFi Prepaid.

On April 11, 2022, PLDT and Smart announced that Sun's postpaid service would be merged with Smart Postpaid, resulting to the subsequent forced retirement of all Sun Postpaid plans and add-ons effective April 25, 2022. Smart encouraged those planning to subscribe to Sun to instead take advantage of Smart Signature plans, while existing subscribers can either still use their current subscription plans or upgrade to Smart Signature. With the planned integration of Sun Postpaid to Smart, the Sun Cellular brand will cease to exist in favor of the Smart brand.

In September 2022, Globe Telecom the mobile number prefixes is still unchanged, with 954 assigned to Globe At Home Prepaid WiFi, 953 assigned to TM, and 976 assigned to GoMo!. That same month, Smart Communications launched new mobile number prefixes, with 960 and 969 assigned to Smart (Prepaid, Postpaid and Bro Prepaid), 981 and 985 assigned to TNT and 964 assigned to Smart Bro WiFi Prepaid (formerly PLDT Home Wifi Prepaid).

Area codes are grouped by the provider with no single contiguous block of codes for a single provider. The companies and their respective area codes are listed below:

See also
ZIP codes in the Philippines

References

ITU allocations list

External links
National Telecommunications Commission
Sorting Out the Philippine Phone System (RemitHome)

Philippines
 
Telecommunications in the Philippines
Philippines communications-related lists